Chuvaki is a rural locality (a village) in Kultayevskoye Rural Settlement, Permsky District, Perm Krai, Russia. The population was 182 as of 2010. There are 10 streets.

Geography 
Chuvaki is located 26 km southwest of Perm (the district's administrative centre) by road. Boldino is the nearest rural locality.

References 

Rural localities in Permsky District